Sojourners Club is a historic women's club and public library building located at Kirksville, Adair County, Missouri. It was built in 1916, and is a two-story, Prairie School / American Craftsman style rectangular brick and stucco building. The building measures approximately 34 feet by 56 feet. It features a full-width, one-story verandah and second-story terrace.

It was listed on the National Register of Historic Places in 2014.

References

Clubhouses on the National Register of Historic Places in Missouri
Libraries on the National Register of Historic Places in Missouri
Prairie School architecture in Missouri
Buildings and structures completed in 1916
Buildings and structures in Adair County, Missouri
National Register of Historic Places in Adair County, Missouri